Funkafied is the third solo studio album by American rapper MC Breed from Flint, Michigan. It was released on June 7, 1994 via Wrap Records with distribution by Ichiban Records. Recording sessions took place at Kala Studios, Digital Edge Studios and Curtom Recording Studio in Atlanta. Production was handled by MC Breed, DJ Flash, DJ Hurricane, Brett Ski, Swift С and Big Man. It features guest appearances from Al Breed, Chuck Nyce, Gary Schider, George Clinton, Jibri, Night & Day, SFD and The D.O.C.

Funkafied was Breed's most successful album chart wise, peaking at #106 on the Billboard 200 and #9 on the Top R&B/Hip-Hop Albums. The album spawned three singles: "Late Night Creep (Booty Call)", "Seven Years"/"What You Want" and "Teach My Kinds". Its lead single, "Late Night Creep (Booty Call)", made it to the Hot Rap Songs chart reaching #43.

Track listing

Charts

References

External links

1994 albums
MC Breed albums
G-funk albums